Janakpur is a sub-metropolitan in Dhanusa District of Nepal.

Janakpur may also refer to:
 Janakpur Airport, airport in Janakpur, Nepal
 Janakpur Road, town in Sitamarhi district, Bihar, India
 Janakpur Zone, former zone of Nepal
 Janakpur Road railway station, railway station in Sitamarhi district, Bihar, India
 Janakpur Today (daily), Nepali language national daily newspaper, published from Janakpurdham

See also 
 Janakpuri (disambiguation)